The Battle of Chapakchur (Turkish:Sancak Muharebesi; Azerbaijani:Səncəq döyüşü) was a decisive battle fought between Qara Qoyunlu (Black Sheep Turkomen) under the leadership of Jahan Shah and Aq Qoyunlu (White Sheep Turkomen) under the leadership of Uzun Hasan. Jahan Shah was defeated by Uzun Hasan in a battle near the sanjak of Çapakçur in present-day eastern Turkey on October 30 (or November 11), 1467.

Background
The conflict between Qara Qoyunlu and Aq Qoyunlu had reached its zenith under the leadership of the former group named Jahan Shah and latter group named Uzun Hassan. Aq Qoyunlu and Qara qoyunlu had been vying for power and regional supremacy for most of the 14th century and 15th century. Both groups were Turkmen. Qara qoyunlu were vassals of the Jalayirid dynasty in Baghdad and Tabriz from about 1375, when the leader of their leading tribe, ruled over Mosul. Aq Qoyunlu was brought to the region by the invasions of Timur the Lame and Kara Koyunlu were uprooted from power. However, after the death of Timur, they returned and hastened the downfall of the Jalayirids whom they had once served.

During Jahan Shah's reign the Kara Koyunlu's territory reached its largest extent, including huge swaths of land in Anatolia, most of present-day Iraq, central Iran, and even eventually Kerman. Uzun Hasan, meanwhile, was restricted initially to Diyarbakir but gradually expanded his territory in Anatolia. After clever diplomacy and regional alliances he managed to stave off the Ottoman Turks and even fought several battles against Qara qoyunlu defeating Jahan Shah on the river Tigris in May 1457. Uzun Hasan avoided all out war with the Ottoman Empire by allowing them to conquer his ally Empire of Trebizond, while he consolidated his power and prepared for the defense of his territory. It was during this time that Jahan Shah wanted to defeat the Aq Qoyunlu ruler Uzun Hasan and make him his vassal. So with that in mind he secured his eastern borders with a peace treaty with the Timurid leader of Samarkand, Abu Sa'id Mirza and then invaded Aq Qoyunlu territory to his west.

Battle
Jahan Shah set out from Tabriz with a great army on May 16, 1466, and came to the basin of Lake Van. While there, he was furious to learn that Uzun Hassan was raiding his lands with 12,000 cavalry. Meanwhile, Uzun Hassan, worried that Jahan Shah was planning to attack him, had carefully guarded the mountain passes. Envoys went back and forth between them, but because of Jahan Shah's heavy demands, an agreement could not be reached. Having advanced as far as Muş, Jahan Shah had to postpone his attack because of the onset of winter. As his troops began to mutiny, he decided to withdraw to a winter residence. Uzun Hassan caught his army by surprise and totally defeated them in a sudden attack on October 30 (or November 11), 1467. Jahan Shah was killed while trying to flee, and with his death the great era of Qara Qoyunlu history came to an end.

Notes

15th century in Iran
Chapakchur
1467 in Asia
History of Bingöl Province
1460s in the Middle East
Chapakchur
Battles involving the Kara Koyunlu